Hopewell is an unincorporated community in Barbour County, West Virginia, United States. It lies at an elevation of 1,388 feet (423 m).

References

Unincorporated communities in Barbour County, West Virginia
Unincorporated communities in West Virginia